Sun Link, also known as the Tucson Streetcar, is a single-line streetcar system in Tucson, Arizona, United States, that began service in July 2014. The system's  route connects the Arizona Health Sciences Center (including University Medical Center), the University of Arizona campus, the Main Gate and 4th Avenue shopping and entertainment districts, downtown Tucson, the Tucson Convention Center, and the Mercado District under development west of Interstate 10. The streetcar project's overall cost of $196 million was met through a combination of local funding sources and federal grants. The streetcar shares a common payment system with the Sun Tran regional bus service.

Funding 
In May 2006 Pima County voters approved a $2.1 billion, 20-year regional transportation plan which included $75 million toward construction of a modern streetcar and an additional $12.7 million toward its operation.  In December 2010, a $63 million federal TIGER grant was awarded to the City of Tucson, meeting most of the remaining funding gap and allowing the project to move forward.  An additional $6 million of federal funding was obtained through the Federal Transit Administration's New Starts program.  Funding also came from utilities for relocation and improvements along the streetcar route, most significantly $10.6 million from Tucson Water.

Construction 

A $56 million contract for removal of existing roadway, utility relocation, installation of track, resurfacing, and construction of the system's 21 covered, accessible stops was awarded to Old Pueblo Trackworks, a joint venture of Granite Construction and RailWorks Track Systems, in March 2012.  Construction began in April 2012 and continued through summer 2013.  The first phase addressed straight sections of the route east of the Congress and Granada stop and required rolling closures of sections of Congress Street, Broadway Boulevard, 4th Avenue, University Boulevard, 2nd Street, the Warren Avenue underpass, and Helen Street.  Phase two began in November 2012 and included all work west of the convention center, corner sections requiring fabrication of curved track elements, and additional work on Broadway and the Warren underpass.

A  bridge across the Santa Cruz serving streetcar, automobile, bicycle, and pedestrian traffic was constructed in 2012 under a separate contract.  Named for former Tucson city manager Luis G. Gutierrez, the bridge extends Cushing Street from the I-10 frontage road to Avenida del Convento, providing a link between the Tucson Convention Center and the Mercado District.

Construction of the Sun Link Operations & Maintenance Facility, an $8 million depot centered on the system route at 5th Avenue and 8th Street, began in May 2012.  A public open house celebrating its completion and delivery of the first streetcar was held on September 6, 2013, with speeches from officials including Tucson mayor Jonathan Rothschild and state senator Steve Farley, a longtime advocate of the streetcar.

Vehicles 

Sun Link maintains a fleet of eight United Streetcar 200s, using up to six cars at once. These are numbered 101 to 108. Its center section floor is at platform height for accessibility with two double-door entrances on each side. Each side has a third passenger door located behind the operator cab. Propulsion is provided by four 90 kW motors drawing power via pantograph from an overhead wire.

The United 200 is largely identical to the 100 model produced for systems in Portland and Washington, D.C., the only major difference being that the 200 is equipped with upgraded air-conditioning.  The design of the 100 model itself is based on the Czech-made Škoda 10 T.

Tucson placed a $26 million order with United for seven cars in June 2010.  An eighth was ordered for an additional $3.6 million in July 2012 in order to satisfy FTA requirements for a second spare.  United's first model 200 car arrived in Tucson by flatbed truck on August 30, 2013.   Delays in streetcar production pushed Sun Link's projected start of service from a forecast of late 2013 as of the start of construction to July 2014.  Tucson officials notified United Streetcar in May 2013 of their intention to assess contractual damages for late delivery.  United's parent company, Vigor Works, formerly Oregon Iron Works, settled with the city in 2016 for $1.7 million to be paid in additional parts and labor.

Service 

Headway in minutes
Weekday service runs every ten minutes during peak hours and every fifteen minutes mornings and evenings.  Saturday morning and Sunday service runs every twenty or thirty minutes.  Half-hour late-night service provided only while the University of Arizona is in session runs through 2am on Thursday, Friday, and Saturday nights.  Travel time from one end of the line to the other is approximately 30 minutes.

One-way fare is $1.75, and includes transfer to connecting Sun Tran busses.  A SunGO pass or fare card, available at the Ronstadt Transit Center, online, and at various retail locations, must be purchased prior to boarding; payment is not accepted by Sun Link drivers.  24-hour passes are available for $4.50 from ticket vending machines located on all Sun Link platforms, payable either in exact change or by credit.  Passengers record payment by scanning fare cards at electronic validators after boarding.

North of the Warren Avenue stop, the streetcar passes under Speedway Boulevard on a single-track line in a dedicated right of way.  After reaching its northern terminus at Helen, the car reverses direction.  In all but one or two other places along the route, the streetcar operates with traffic.

Route 

Stops listed from east to west; district names and coloration taken from official Sun Link routemap.

Potential expansion 
In late 2019, media reports surfaced that the government of Tucson was looking into options for expanding the streetcar network. The potential expansion could go as far north as Tucson Mall and reach Tucson International Airport south of the city, connecting all three of the city's main transit hubs: Laos, Ronstadt(Downtown), and Tohono Transit Center. As of date, Tucson and South Tucson have requested funding from Federal Transit Administration for a feasibility study, pending approval. So far, no timeline of the project has been announced.

See also 

 Light rail in the United States
 Low-floor tram
 Old Pueblo Trolley
 Streetcars in North America

References

External links 

 Sun Link official website
 City of Tucson
 Regional Transportation Authority
 Maintenance Design Group

Transportation in Tucson, Arizona
Railway lines opened in 2014
RATP Group
Streetcars in Arizona
Electric railways in Arizona
2014 establishments in Arizona